Halley is a unisex given name. Notable people with the name include:

Female
 Halley Feiffer (born 1984), American actress
 Halley Gross (born 1985), American screenwriter
 Halley Brewster Savery Hough (1894–1967), American art curator

Male
 Halley Harding (1904-1967), American baseball player
 Halley G. Maddox (1899–1977), American career officer
 Halley H. Prosser (1870–1921), American politician
 Halley Stewart (1838–1937), English businessman

See also
 Hayley, similar given name with other spellings
 Halley (surname)
 Halley (disambiguation)